Allamuchy Mountain State Park is located in Allamuchy Township and Byram Township in the Allamuchy Mountain region of New Jersey. The park is operated and maintained by the New Jersey Division of Parks and Forestry.

The park is in the Northeastern coastal forests ecoregion. The  of mixed oak and hardwood forests and maintained fields of this natural area display various stages of succession. It is situated on the Musconetcong River.

Waterloo Village 

Waterloo Village has exhibits from many different time periods from a 400-year-old Lenape (Delaware) Native American village to a port along the once prosperous Morris Canal. The early 19th-century village contains a working mill with gristmills and sawmills, a general store, a blacksmith shop and restored houses.

Sussex Branch Trail

The Sussex Branch Trail, a rail trail on the former Sussex Railroad, has a trail head on Waterloo Road. It travels  to Cranberry Lake.

Rutherfurd-Stuyvesant Estate
The Rutherfurd-Stuyvesant Estate dates back to the 1700s and featured a large mansion and many outbuildings. By the mid 20th century, the mansion had burned down and the remaining buildings were in very poor condition. In the 1960s, the estate was purchased by the State to build route 80, which divided sections of the estate with an eight-lane highway. In the 1970s, the Allamuchy Mountain land became part of Allamuchy Mountain State Park. Tranquillity Farms, on the other side of the highway, remains a privately operated commercial farm.

Locally, the ruins of the Rutherfurd-Stuyvesant Estate have become known as "Profanity House" because many of the buildings and ruins have been vandalized and covered in explicit and graphic graffiti. In recent years, the estate has suffered from arson damage.

See also

 Rutherfurd Hall

References

External links 

 NY-NJ Trail Conference: Allamuchy Mountain State Park Trail Details and Info

State parks of New Jersey
Parks in Sussex County, New Jersey
Parks in Warren County, New Jersey
Byram Township, New Jersey